Mambalu (also Romanized as Mambalū; also known as Mambalūn) is a village in Khafri Rural District, in the Central District of Sepidan County, Fars Province, Iran. At the 2006 census, its population was 209, in 57 families.

References 

Populated places in Sepidan County